Sible Hedingham is a large village and civil parish in the Colne Valley in the Braintree District of Essex, in England. It has a population of 3,994 according to the 2011 census. Sible Hedingham lies in the northern corner of Essex, close to both the Suffolk and Cambridgeshire borders.

The Domesday Book lists the village together with Hedingham Castle amongst the lands given to Roger Bigod by the king.  The land included woodland for 70 pigs that was in total valued at £4.

A variation on the village name is "Hengham Sybyle".

In 1863, Sible Hedingham was the site of one of the last 19th century witchcraft accusations in England. The victim is now known as "Dummy, the Witch of Sible Hedingham".

The village is twinned with the French commune of Choisy-au-Bac, located in Picardy region, Oise department (c. 80 km north of Paris, near Compiègne).

Notable people associated with Sible Hedingham 
 J. Redwood Anderson (1883–1964), poet died here
 Rachel Barrett (1874–1953), suffragette and newspaper editor 
 Savitri Devi (1905–1982), prominent proponent of Nazism, animal rights and deep ecology, who died here
 'Dummy' , an unnamed elderly deaf mute man murdered by a mob in 1863 after he was accused of witchcraft.
 Sir John Hawkwood (1320–1394), English mercenary (or Condottiero) who was active in 14th-century Italy
 John Hilton (surgeon) FRCS, FRS, FZS (1805–1878), Surgeon Extraordinary to Queen Victoria and greatest anatomist of his time
 Joan Prentice, a woman living in a almshouse here who was accused of witchcraft and she was hanged in Chelmsford in 1589.
 Samuel Wilbore (1595-1656) – a founder of Portsmouth Colony (Rhode Island, US; 7 March 1638) as a religious dissenter from the Plymouth Colony of Boston, Massachusetts

References

External links 

Villages in Essex
Braintree District